Siwani is a town and a municipality in Bhiwani district in the north Indian state of Haryana. It is the administrative headquarters of Siwani tehsil.

Demographics
As of 2001 India census, Siwani had a population of 15,849. Males constitute 53% of the population and females 47%. Siwani has an average literacy rate of 57%, lower than the national average of 59.5%: male literacy is 66%, and female literacy is 46%. In Siwani, 17% of the population is under 6 years of age.

Economy
Siwani Mandi is known in the Bhiwani district for its agricultural market. There are many Guar Gum factories and dall mill in Siwani.

Notable people
 Arvind Kejriwal, Chief Minister of Delhi

References

Cities and towns in Bhiwani district